Silver Arcade is a Grade II listed building in the centre of Leicester, England. A former shopping arcade, Silver Arcade was built by Amos Hall in 1889. The top floor was closed off in 2000, leaving the units on the ground floor occupied by a number of independent retailers. In 2008, the centre was the focus of a campaign by the Leicester Civic Society to reopen it.

In 2010, plans were announced to reopen the top floors. Later plans in 2019 were announced to convert two floors of the building into office space.

References

Buildings and structures in Leicester
Shopping centres in Leicestershire
Grade II listed buildings in Leicestershire
Tourist attractions in Leicestershire
Commercial buildings completed in 1889
Shopping arcades in England
Grade II listed retail buildings
Shopping malls established in 1889